Oakridge Park (and formerly known as Oakridge Centre) is a shopping centre in the Oakridge neighborhood of Vancouver, British Columbia, Canada. It is located at the intersection of West 41st Avenue and Cambie Street.

It was originally opened in 1959 by Woodward's Stores which anchored the centre until it was sold to Hudson's Bay in 1993. A Target was originally planned but however in 2015 Target Canada filed for bankruptcy protection and announced the closing of all stores cancelling 4 locations. It is one of the two largest malls located within the city of Vancouver, the other being CF Pacific Centre, and along with Pacific Centre are two of the most profitable shopping centres in Canada.

Image gallery

Redevelopment & Remodeling
Oakridge Park is now the centre point for the Oakridge Municipal Town Centre Project, part of a Vancouver urban densification project creating a new transit oriented, high density region with tall apartment towers much like Vancouver's West End in an area now occupied and to be surrounded by single family residences, all easily accessed by the Oakridge-41st station of the Canada Line. The application was approved in 2014 and construction has begun in late 2019. Construction regarding the North and South tower complexes are scheduled to be completed by late 2025. On September 15, 2020, it was announced that the mall would be closing on September 30, 2020 to demolish the structure to make way for the redevelopment but however, Crate & Barrel and the office towers will remain open during the redevelopment construction.

Transportation access
The Oakridge–41st Avenue station on the Canada Line is under the plaza at the southwest corner of 41st and Cambie. An additional new underground entrance is likely to be constructed with the redevelopment. The mall is also served by TransLink bus service along 41st Avenue and Cambie Street. Parking can be accessed via 44th and Cambie or 45th and Cambie - Due to the ongoing construction, several entrances and parking lots have been shut down.

See also
 List of shopping malls in Canada

References

Official site
Oakridge Policy Planning Program

External links

Shopping malls in Metro Vancouver
Shopping malls established in 1959
Buildings and structures in Vancouver
Tourist attractions in Vancouver